Beauvoisin is the name or part of the name of several communes in France:

 Beauvoisin, in the Drôme department
 Beauvoisin, in the Gard department
 Beauvoisin, former commune of the Jura department, now part of Asnans-Beauvoisin